Geib is a surname. Notable people with the surname include:
 Karl-Hermann Geib (1908–1949), German physical chemist 
 Robert Geib (1911–1996), Luxembourgian footballer
 Theodor Geib (1885–1944), German military officer
 Tori Geib (1986–2021), American chef and cancer patient advocate